Vinita Gupta (born 1950) is an Indian-born American businesswoman. She is the founder and chairman of Digital Link Corporation (now Quick Eagle Networks). She is credited with being the first woman of Indian origin to take her company public in the United States.

Early life and education
Gupta was born in 1950 in India and spent her early years in Delhi. In 1973 she earned a bachelor's degree in electronics and communications from the University of Roorkee (now Indian Institute of Technology Roorkee). In 1974 she came to the United States and earned an M.S. in electrical engineering from University of California Los Angeles.

Career 
In her early career, Gupta worked as an engineer for GTE Lenkurt and later held engineering management positions at Bell Northern Research (now part of Nortel Networks).

In May 1985 Gupta founded Digital Link Corporation, a company which engaged in the design, manufacture, marketing, and support of digital wide area network access products for global networks. The company went public in 1994 and was later renamed as Quick Eagle Networks. Gupta still serves as chairman, chief executive officer and president.

Gupta also serves as chairman of Palo Alto Medical Foundation Research Institute. She also serves on the board of Indian School of Business (ISB), Hyderabad and Cancer Prevention Institute of California.

Gupta holds two US Patents, one for a solid state relay issued in 1984 and another for a square root circuit issued in 1986.

Honors 
 
For two consecutive years, Working Woman Magazine has named Digital Link one of the top 500 women-owned businesses in the United States. She was 1999 honoree at Asian Pacific Fund.

Personal life 
Gupta was married to Narendra K. Gupta, vice chairman and interim president and CEO of Wind River Systems, and co-founder of Integrated Systems Inc. until his death on 25 December 2021. Gupta has two daughters.

References 

American business executives
1969 births
Living people
IIT Roorkee alumni
UCLA Henry Samueli School of Engineering and Applied Science alumni
Nortel employees